The Traxler Counterattack, also known as the Wilkes-Barre Variation, is a chess opening that begins with the moves:

 1. e4 e5
 2. Nf3 Nc6
 3. Bc4 Nf6
 4. Ng5 Bc5!?

The opening is a variation of the Two Knights Defense where White has chosen the offensive line 4.Ng5 immediately attacking the f7-square with the knight and bishop, and Black's last move counterattacks the f2-square with the bishop, and is one of several ways to avoid the Fried Liver Attack.

The variation was first seen in the game Reinisch vs Karel Traxler played in Hostouň in 1890. Later it was named after Wilkes-Barre, Pennsylvania by Frank Marshall, who claimed to be first to analyze and publish it, so today 4...Bc5 is known as both the Traxler Variation and (in the United States and the United Kingdom only) the Wilkes-Barre Variation.

The opening is classified as code C57 in the Encyclopaedia of Chess Openings.

5. Nxf7 

This is an extremely natural move and the whole point of Ng5. The knight is defended by the bishop on c4, and is forking the black queen and rook. But now the shocking sacrifice 5...Bxf2+! will draw out the white king and bring the black queen into play with gain of time.

If White captures the bishop, Black can continue the attack with 6...Nxe4+, after which Kg1 and Ke3 are considered the best moves (as moving the king to any square where it can be checked can lead to a decisive attack for black), both of which are usually followed up by Qh4.

The best move after Bxf2+ is 7.Kf1, as the white king can no longer be checked, forcing Black to play Qe7 moving out of danger, and allowing White to capture the rook. However, after 7...d5! 8.exd5 Nd4 Black still has a strong attack, but White maintains advantage after 9.d6!.

5. Bxf7+! 
This move is preferred by most modern masters, winning a pawn and avoiding the complications that arise after 5.Nxf7 Bxf2+. After 5. ... Ke7 (better than Kf8 as Black should free the f-file for the king's rook), White should move the bishop again since if it stays on f7, Black can play h6 attacking the knight and undermining the defense of the bishop. White is considered to have a slight edge, but lagging in development due to having to move the bishop and knight multiple times. The absence of the f7-pawn may also be used in Black's favour, as the rook will be active on f8 and the idea Qe8-g6(-h5) is a new possibility.

The main line continues with 6.Bd5, which is often given an exclamation mark by theory books. This precise move gives rise to the possibility of future Bxc6 as well as over protecting the e4-pawn. Black has a chance to exchange knight for bishop but the knight exchange reduces Black's counterattacking chances. Black can now develop the rook to f8, threatening to win the f2-pawn by Bxf2+, Kxf2 and Nxd5+ discovered check.

Illustrative games 

J Reinisch vs Karel Traxler, Hostouň 1890:

1.e4 e5 2.Nf3 Nc6 3.Bc4 Nf6 4.Ng5 Bc5 5.Nxf7 Bxf2+ 6.Ke2??

This way of declining the Traxler is inferior to Kf1 as Black does not have to play Qe7 since the white king is still exposed to checks.

6...Nd4+ 7.Kd3? b5!

If White plays 8.Nxd8, Black will win back the queen after 8...bxc4+ 9.Kxc4 Ba6+ 10.Kb4 Be2 trapping the queen.

8.Bb3 Nxe4!! 9.Nxd8

Traxler comments, "White has no defense; the mating finale is pretty."

9...Nc5+ 10.Kc3 Ne2+! 11.Qxe2 Bd4+ 12.Kb4 a5+ 13.Kxb5 Ba6+ 14.Kxa5 Bd3+ 15.Kb4 Na6+ 16.Ka4 Nb4+ 17.Kxb4 c5#

Black sacrifices his queen and both knights to chase the king to the edge of the board and create a mating net, where the pawn, rook and bishops deliver checkmate.

References

External links 

 
 Traxler Counter Attack The Chess Website by Kevin Butler

Chess openings